In probability theory, the matrix geometric method is a method for the analysis of quasi-birth–death processes, continuous-time Markov chain whose transition rate matrices with a repetitive block structure. The method was developed "largely by Marcel F. Neuts and his students starting around 1975."

Method description

The method requires a transition rate matrix with tridiagonal block structure as follows

where each of B00, B01, B10, A0, A1 and A2 are matrices. To compute the stationary distribution π writing π Q = 0 the balance equations are considered for sub-vectors πi

Observe that the relationship 

holds where R is the Neut's rate matrix, which can be computed numerically. Using this we write

which can be solve to find π0 and π1 and therefore iteratively all the πi.

Computation of R

The matrix R can be computed using cyclic reduction or logarithmic reduction.

Matrix analytic method

The matrix analytic method is a more complicated version of the matrix geometric solution method used to analyse models with block M/G/1 matrices. Such models are harder because no relationship like πi = π1 Ri – 1 used above holds.

External links

 Performance Modelling and Markov Chains (part 2) by William J. Stewart at 7th International School on Formal Methods for the Design of Computer, Communication and Software Systems: Performance Evaluation

References

Queueing theory